Locust Fork is a town in Blount County, Alabama, United States. At the 2010 census the population was 1,186 people, up from 1,016 in 2000.

History

While traveling south with his troops in 1815, General Andrew Jackson camped along a river in the area. General Jackson carved his name in a locust tree, naming the area Locust Fork. In the early 1800s Nick Hudson built a public inn in what is now Locust Fork. He erected barns to shelter the horses and hogs of the Tennessee farmers who drove them to the deeper South for a more profitable market.

Locust Fork was incorporated January 18, 1977.

Notable People:

Dalton “Breeze” Bailey

Mike “The Boy” Reid 

Shiane Cater

Geography
Locust Fork is located southwest of the center of Blount County, at 33°53'47.494" North, 86°37'50.048" West (33.896526, -86.630569). It is situated on a bluff overlooking the Blackburn Fork of the Little Warrior River.

Locust Fork is located in one of the northeast-to-southwest valleys that make up the southern end of the Appalachian mountain chain. Sand Mountain forms the southeast side of the valley, and McAnnally Mountain and Hog Mountain form part of a broader, more broken ridge to the northwest. The area has been mined for coal over the past 100 years, but no current active coal mining operations exist in the immediate area, which consists of rolling hill farm country.

Demographics

2020 census

As of the 2020 United States census, there were 1,192 people, 467 households, and 381 families residing in the town.

2010 census
As of the census of 2010, there were 1,186 people, 435 households, and 342 families residing in the town. The population density was 119.1/km2 (308/mi2). There were 469 housing units at an average density of 46.9/km2 (120.2/mi2). The racial makeup of the town was 97.0% White, 0.8% Native American, 1.0% from other races, and 0.6% from two or more races. 2.4% of the population were Hispanic or Latino of any race.

There were 435 households, out of which 32.6% had children under the age of 18 living with them, 66.2% were married couples living together, 8.5% had a female householder with no husband present, and 21.4% were non-families. 17.9% of all households were made up of individuals, and 8.5% had someone living alone who was 65 years of age or older. The average household size was 2.73 and the average family size was 3.08.

In the town, the age distribution of the population shows 24.6% under the age of 18, 7.9% from 18 to 24, 24.0% from 25 to 44, 28.7% from 45 to 64, and 14.8% who were 65 years of age or older. The median age was 40.3 years. For every 100 females, there were 99.7 males. For every 100.8 females age 18 and over, there were 96.5 males.

The median income for a household in the town was $55,313, and the median income for a family was $59,167. Males had a median income of $41,776 versus $40,114 for females. The per capita income for the town was $21,356. About 9.2% of families and 11.4% of the population were below the poverty line, including 20.3% of those under age 18 and 14.1% of those age 65 or over.

Transportation and growth
Locust Fork straddles Alabama State Route 79, which is a north–south highway running from Birmingham  to the south and Scottsboro  to the northeast. Blount County Road 13 runs northwestward to connect to Alabama Highway 160 between the communities of Hayden and Nectar. Blount County Road 15 intersects Alabama 79 just north of Locust Fork and provides a connection to the county seat of Oneonta,  to the east. Locust Fork is located along one of the two major Alabama state highways that run northeast from Birmingham to the Sand Mountain area of Guntersville, Albertville, and Boaz. It is an alternate route from Birmingham to Huntsville and Chattanooga.

The Locust Fork area has and continues to see strong residential growth mainly due to outflow from Jefferson County as residents there seek a more rural environment as well as a lower tax structure. As a result of this growth, enrollment in schools has risen substantially. Also, traffic along the main Highway 79 artery has risen, and the road has become increasingly dangerous between the termination of a four-lane divided highway just north of Pinson and Locust Fork. There has been some discussion of upgrading the road to four-lane status, but such work is still considered several years away. Locust Fork will also be impacted by the eventual construction of the Northern Beltline, which is slated to cross Highway 79 just north of Pinson. This controlled-access highway (officially designated as Interstate 422) will provide much quicker access for Locust Fork residents traveling east to Trussville or westward to Gardendale, Graysville, and Tuscaloosa. However, this route is still 10–15 years away from completion.

Government

Locust Fork is an incorporated town and has a mayor and town council elected by the citizens.  The mayor and council are elected for four-year terms. The current mayor is Joseph Hughes, and the current council members are Weslie Powell (Mayor Pro-Tem), Robert Chamblee, Barbara Richey, Joseph Lay and Joey White. The Community Center has been named after Sarah Holt, former Mayor and Council Person, serving the community for over 30 years.

Schools

Locust Fork High School and Elementary School are located in the center of the town along the west side of Alabama Highway 79.  The school nickname is Hornets with school colors of green and white. Locust Fork High School is currently classified as a 2A school under the AHSAA 7 tier classification system. There is a ratio of one teacher for every 20 students. The schools draw their students from a large portion of southern and southwestern Blount County. The schools are part of the Blount County School System. The high school football stadium is named Gary Pate Field in honor of a former Locust Fork football coach.  The Lady Hornets Basketball Team won the 2016-2017 AHSAA 3A State Championship, the first State Championship of any kind for Locust Fork High School.

Parks and municipal facilities

Locust Fork has a city park located on the west side of Alabama Highway 79 just south of the high school. The park includes a walking trail, playground for small children, picnic facilities, pavilion, barbecue pit, one baseball field, one T-ball field and one softball field. The Locust Fork Community Center is located just south of the park on Highway 79.  Contact the Locust Fork Town Hall for more information regarding the Community Center.  The Town Hall is open from 8-12 and 1–4, Monday through Thursday. The nearest golf courses are the highly acclaimed semi-private Limestone Springs (located just off Blount County Route 15 east of the town) and the public course The Plantation (located at the corner of Blount County Route 13 and Alabama Highway 160 just west of the town).

Churches
There are several churches representing several denominations located in or near Locust Fork. The town has the largest Baptist church in the county.

Businesses

A host of small businesses and retail outlets are located in the community.  Casual fast food dining is available at three chain outlets, Subway, Jack's Hamburgers, and Burger King; two local family diners and bakeries, Daisy's (open three days a week for lunch) and Birtie's (open Tue-Fri 10am-8pm), and a Mexican restaurant open 7 days a week. The community is served by a volunteer fire department that provides fire suppression and Advanced Life Support Pre-hospital EMS Services and is patrolled by the Blount County Sheriff's Office. There is a dental office, pharmacy, medical clinic and general retail in Locust Fork.

Media 

Locust Fork is located in the Birmingham television and radio market.  Newspapers include The Birmingham News and The Blount Countian.

References

External links
Town of Locust Fork official website
Locust Fork High School

Towns in Alabama
Towns in Blount County, Alabama
Birmingham metropolitan area, Alabama